Captain Sir William Hoste, 1st Baronet KCB RN (26 August 17806 December 1828) was a Royal Navy captain. Best known as one of Lord Nelson's protégés, Hoste was one of the great frigate captains of the Napoleonic wars, taking part in six major actions including the capture of the heavily fortified port of Kotor. He was, however, absent from Trafalgar having been sent with gifts to the Dey of Algiers.

Childhood and education
He was the second of eight children of Reverend Dixon Hoste (1750–1805) and Margaret Stanforth. At the time of his birth his father was rector of Godwick and Tittleshall in Norfolk. He was born at Ingoldisthorpe, and the family later moved to Godwick Hall, east of Tittleshall, which was leased from Thomas Coke, who later became the 1st Earl of Leicester, of Holkham Hall. His next brother, George Charles Hoste, became an officer in the Royal Engineers.

Hoste was educated for a time at King's Lynn and later at the Paston School in North Walsham, where Horatio Nelson himself had been to school some years previously.

That time coincided with the outbreak of war with France in February 1793. Lacking any influence or naval contacts himself, Dixon Hoste asked his landlord, Thomas Coke, for assistance and was introduced to Nelson, then living nearby in Burnham Thorpe and who had recently been appointed as Captain of  a 64-gun third-rate, which was being fitted out at Chatham Dockyard.

Early career

HMS Agamemnon

The ship joined the Mediterranean Fleet under Lord Hood, and it was in the Mediterranean and Adriatic that Hoste saw most of his naval service. Extracts from Nelson's letters to his wife mention Hoste frequently; for example: 'without exception one of the finest boys I ever met with' and 'his gallantry never can be exceeded, and each day rivets him stronger to my heart'. Another captain's servant on Agamemnon was Josiah Nisbet, Nelson's stepson, but the letters suggest that Hoste quickly became a favourite and that Josiah compared badly with him in many respects. Hoste was promoted to midshipman by Nelson on 1 February 1794 and served with him during the blockade of and subsequent assault on Corsica on 7 February.

HMS Captain and the battle of Cape St Vincent

Captain started the battle towards the rear of the British line. Instead of continuing to follow the line, Nelson disobeyed orders and wore ship, and made for the Spanish van, which consisted of the 112-gun San Josef, the 80-gun San Nicolas and the 130-gun Santísima Trinidad. After an hour of exchanging broadsides which left both Captain and Culloden heavily damaged, Nelson found himself alongside the San Nicolas which he boarded and forced her surrender. San Josef attempted to come to the San Nicolas'''s aid, but became entangled with her compatriot and was left immobile. Nelson led his party from the deck of the San Nicolas onto the San Josef and captured her as well.

HMS Theseus

In June 1797, he transferred to  a 74-gun third-rate. Theseus was a 'troubled' ship, and Nelson and a few handpicked officers, including Hoste, Captain Ralph Willett Miller and Lieutenant John Weatherhead, were sent aboard to restore order. The tactic was successful and Nelson received a letter from the would-be mutineers which stated, "We thank the Admiral (Nelson) for the Officers he has placed over us".

In July, Theseus was present at the Battle of Santa Cruz de Tenerife, although Hoste remained aboard and took no part in the assault.
Following the death of a Lieutenant Weatherhead in the battle, Nelson promoted Hoste to lieutenant to fill the vacancy, his position being confirmed, thanks to his 'book time' in Europa, in February 1798.

The battle of the Nile

Later that year, Hoste, still aboard HMS Theseus, was at the Battle of the Nile. The Royal Navy fleet was outnumbered, at least in firepower, by the French fleet, which boasted the 118-gun ship-of-the-line L'Orient, three 80-gun warships and nine of the popular 74-gun ships. The Royal Navy fleet in comparison had just thirteen 74-gun ships and one 50-gun fourth-rate. Nevertheless, the battle was a decisive victory for the British.

Following the battle, Nelson sent his report to London, taking the precaution of sending a duplicate in the brig , commanded by Lieutenant Thomas Capel. At Naples, Capel was to carry on with the dispatch, handing command of Mutine to Hoste. Upon taking command, Hoste became an acting-captain at the age of 18. Hoste, carrying news of the victory, first sailed to Gibraltar, before rejoining the fleet, under St Vincent, off Cadiz. His promotion was confirmed in December 1798.

Command
Hoste continued in command of the Mutine for the next three years, campaigning in Italy under Nelson, where in the autumn of 1799, he took part in the capture of Rome. He later served under Lord Keith, who knew little of him and his career appeared to have stalled until, possibly at Nelson's prompting, he was promoted post-captain by Lord St Vincent, First Lord of the Admiralty, in January 1802.

At this time, Hoste was in Alexandria, where he contracted malaria and then a lung infection, which were to have a lasting effect on his health. He convalesced with Lord and Lady Elgin in Athens, where he began an education in classical antiquity, completed following his appointment to the frigate  in Florence, when his ship was cruising on the Italian coast.

Notable actions
Nelson summoned him to Cadiz in September 1805 and gave him command of the 32-gun frigate . Sent on a diplomatic mission to Algiers, he missed the Battle of Trafalgar by a matter of days, and only learned of Nelson's death on his return in November. He wrote to his father – "Not to have been in it is enough to make one mad, but to have lost such a friend besides is really sufficient to almost overwhelm me" (Hoste's letters).

A number of successes while engaged on active service in the Mediterranean over the following 18 months brought Hoste to the attention of Lord Collingwood, who sent him into the Adriatic Sea. Here he single-handedly conducted an aggressive campaign against enemy shipping and coastal installations, bringing coastal trade with the enemy more or less to a halt. By the end of 1809, Hoste and his crew had captured or sunk over 200 enemy ships.

In March and April 1810 alone, they took or destroyed 46 vessels.

The French and their allies became so frustrated by the disruption to their shipping that a Franco-Venetian squadron, under the command of an aggressive frigate commander named Bernard Dubourdieu, was dispatched and on 13 March 1811 they attacked Hoste's small force in what became known as the Battle of Lissa.

Battle of Lissa

Dubourdieu's squadron of seven frigates and four smaller warships possessing a total of 276 guns and nearly 2,000 men significantly outnumbered Hoste with his 4 frigates mounting only 124 guns and manned by less than 900 men. The French officer imitated Nelson's attack at Trafalgar by sailing down on the English line from windward with his ships in two lines. However, signalling 'Remember Nelson' to rally his men, Hoste used his superior seamanship and gunnery to overcome the larger enemy force, with the loss of 50 men killed and 132 wounded. Dubourdieu was killed, one of the French frigates was driven on shore, another captured, and two of the Venetian frigates were taken.

Hoste's signal had a profound effect on his men. It was universally greeted with loud cheers and Captain Hornby of the Volage wrote of it later: "Never again so long as I live shall I see so interesting or so glorious moment".

Hoste continued to demonstrate the same kind of initiative and aggression as before. He helped capture Spalato (Split) in November 1813 with the assistance from the 35th regiment of foot. Then working with Montenegrin forces, he attacked the mountain fortress of Cattaro, hauling ships' cannon and mortars to positions above the fort using block and tackle. The French garrison had no alternative but to surrender, which it did on 5 January 1814. Hoste immediately repeated these tactics at Ragusa (now Dubrovnik), which also surrendered later on the 27th.

Later life

Hoste's health, compromised by his malaria and earlier lung infection, worsened and he was forced to return to England. In 1814, he was made a baronet, and in 1815 he was knighted KCB. In 1825, he was appointed to the royal yacht Royal Sovereign''.

In January 1828, he developed a cold which affected his already weakened lungs, and he died of tuberculosis in London on 6 December 1828. He was buried in St John's Chapel, London. There is a memorial to him at St Paul's Cathedral in London.

Personal life
He married Lady Harriet Walpole (1 March 179218 April 1875) on 17 April 1817. She was the daughter of Horatio Walpole, 2nd Earl of Orford and Sophia Churchill.
They had the following children:
 Caroline Harriet Clementina Hoste.
 Priscilla Anne Hoste (Unknown21 October 1854).
 Admiral Sir William Legge George Hoste (19 March 181810 Sept 1868).
 Theodore Oxford Raphael Hoste (31 July 18191835).
 Psyche Rose Elizabeth Hoste (4 April 18228 July 1904).
 Wyndham Horatio Nelson Hoste (2 Feb 1825).

Legacy
Hoste's actions at Cattaro and Ragusa were later immortalised in fiction, where they are attributed to Captain Jack Aubrey, the principal character in Patrick O'Brian's 20 novels of the Aubrey–Maturin series. His actions at Lissa were also imortalised in the Kydd Series, where they are attributed to Captain Thomas Kydd, the protagonist of the Kydd Series written by Julian Stockwin. One of the southernmost islands of Chile is named Hoste Island after him. A small islet in the entrance to the bay of Vis town is named Host after him, while The Sir William Hoste Cricket Club in Vis was founded by the Croatian islanders after learning that he had organised the game there during the British occupation of the island.

The Hoste Hotel in Burnham Market, Norfolk, is such named after William Hoste and features a Lord Nelson museum tribute.

Once, while in conversation with Hoste's father, Nelson remarked: 

Lord Radstock once wrote:

Notes

References

Further reading

External links

 
 Island of Vis
 Sir William Hoste Cricket Club
 The Hoste Arms Hotel
 William Hoste at Three Decks - Warships in the Age of Sail.

1780 births
1828 deaths
19th-century deaths from tuberculosis
Knights Commander of the Order of the Bath
People from Ingoldisthorpe
Royal Navy officers
Royal Navy personnel of the French Revolutionary Wars
Royal Navy personnel of the Napoleonic Wars
Tuberculosis deaths in England
Baronets in the Baronetage of the United Kingdom
People educated at Paston College
People from Tittleshall